Abu Zar may refer to:

Abi Zar, a companion of Prophet Muhammad and a Shi'a of Ali according to Shi'a views
Abu Zar, Kerman (ابوذر - Abū Ẕar)
Abu Zar, Khuzestan (اباذر - Abū Z̄ar)